Annville Township is a township and census-designated place in Lebanon County, Pennsylvania, United States. The population was 4,767 at the 2010 census.

History
Annville Township was divided into North Annville Township and South Annville Township in 1845. In 1912, the new Annville Township was formed between the two to encompass the town of Annville.

Geography
Annville Township is located at  (40.330162, -76.512533).

Annville has a humid continental climate and is classified "Dfa" on Köppen climate classification. Annville gets warm to hot summers and cold winters. Winters bring 40" of snow annually.

The township is bordered to the north and west by North Annville Township (3.2 mi), to the south and west by South Annville Township (3 mi), and to the east by Cleona (0.47 mi) and North Cornwall Township (0.25 mi).

Demographics
As of the 2000 census, there were 4,518 people, 1,452 households, and 917 families residing in the township. The population density was 2,864.6 people per square mile (1,104.1/km). There were 1,556 housing units at an average density of 986.6/sq mi (380.2/km). The racial makeup of the township was 95.40% White, 1.08% African American, 0.02% Native American, 1.24% Asian, 0.11% Pacific Islander, 0.97% from other races, and 1.17% from two or more races. Hispanic or Latino of any race were 1.79% of the population.

There were 1,452 households, out of which 27.8% had children under the age of 18 living with them, 51.0% were married couples living together, 8.3% had a female householder with no husband present, and 36.8% were non-families. 29.1% of all households were made up of individuals, and 11.8% had someone living alone who was 65 years of age or older. The average household size was 2.35 and the average family size was 2.87.

In the township, the population was spread out, with 16.3% under the age of 18, 31.2% from 18 to 24, 23.1% from 25 to 44, 15.9% from 45 to 64, and 13.5% who were 65 years of age or older. The median age was 28 years. For every 100 females, there were 88.1 males. For every 100 females age 18 and over, there were 85.3 males.

The median income for a household in the township was $37,415, and the median income for a family was $44,737. Males had a median income of $35,057 versus $23,458 for females. The per capita income for the township was $16,586. About 1.5% of families and 6.3% of the population were below the poverty line, including 3.6% of those under age 18 and 6.0% of those age 65 or over.

Points of interest
Annville Mill, a commercial flour mill, since 1740.
Biever House, a historic -story limestone residence built in 1814. This site was placed on the National Register of Historic Places in 1978 
Lebanon Valley College, a private four-year institution with an enrollment of approximately 1,650 undergraduate and graduate students.

Notable people 
Steve Blackman, former professional wrestler
Russ Diamond (born 1963), businessman, political activist, member of the Pennsylvania House of Representatives
John W. Killinger (1824-1896), former lawyer, prosecuting attorney, member of the Pennsylvania House of Representatives, Pennsylvania Senate, and United States House of Representatives
Aaron Shenk Kreider (1863-1929), former businessman, commissioner and chairman of the Board of Commissioners of Annville from 1909 to 1912; Republican member of the U.S. House of Representatives from Pennsylvania, 1913-1923
Dorothy Wilken (born 1936), former council member and mayor of Boca Raton, Florida, 1974–78; county commissioner of Palm Beach County, Florida, 1982–88; clerk (Fifteenth Judicial Circuit, Florida) and comptroller for Palm Beach County, Florida, 1993-2005

References

External links

Census-designated places in Lebanon County, Pennsylvania
Census-designated places in Pennsylvania
Townships in Lebanon County, Pennsylvania
Townships in Pennsylvania